"Evlenmeliyiz" (En. We Should Marry) is the lead single, thirteenth overall, by Turkish singer Hadise from her fourth studio album Kahraman.

Music video
The music video for "Evlenmeliyiz" was filmed in front of a green screen and was filmed in one shot. The music video starts off with Hadise walking down a country road, then the set is quickly changed so that she is outside a café. Hadise is then seen getting out of her seat and continues to sing whilst the set is being cleared and a car is the bought on stage. Hadise is then seen "driving", the set is then changed to a boat, then a red carpet with paparazzi. The scene is then changed to show Hadise "driving" on a moped, then finally the scene is changed to a performing stage.

Charts

References

2009 singles
Hadise songs
2009 songs
EMI Records singles